Colposcenia is a genus of bug in the subfamily Aphalarinae.

References

External links 

 
 Colposcenia at insectoid.info

Aphalaridae
Psylloidea genera